Haeju Yun clan was one of the Korean clans. Their Bon-gwan was in Haeju, Hwanghae Province. According to the research in 2000, the number of Haeju Yun clan was 899. He was a son of Yun Sin who served as an imperial magistrate (fuyin) in Ming dynasty. He was a younger brother of Yun Bong who was a eunuch in Ming dynasty. He was dispatched to Joseon as an assistant of Yun Bong. Then, he was granted some government posts such as Minister of War.

See also 
 Korean clan names of foreign origin

References

External links 
 

 
Korean clan names of Chinese origin